Zou Yixin or Chou Yi-Hsin (1911–1997) was a Chinese astronomer, who has been called "the first female astronomer in China".

References

1911 births
1997 deaths
Chinese women astronomers
Sun Yat-sen University alumni
Academic staff of Sun Yat-sen University